Carmel ( Karmel) is an Israeli settlement organized as a moshav in the south-east Mount Hebron (Har Hevron in Hebrew) area of the West Bank, close to the Palestinian Bedouin from the village of Umm al-Kheir, who settled there several decades ago after Israel expelled them from the Arad desert, and who purchased the land from residents in the Palestinian village of Yatta. According to David Shulman, Carmel lies on lands appropriated from the Bedouin of that village. It falls under the jurisdiction of the Har Hevron Regional Council and associates ideologically with the Amana settlement movement.

The international community considers Israeli settlements in the West Bank illegal under international law, but the Israeli government disputes this.

Etymology
The name Carmel was chosen due to the moshav's close proximity to the location of biblical Carmel.

History
Initially founded in 1980, next to the land on which the Hadaleen Bedouin tribe live, as a Nahal military-establishment through a "military seizure order", the settlement was "civilianized" in 1981.

Reuta Beth midrash was established in 2001 which is also a hesder yeshiva.

According to Nicholas Kristof of The New York Times, writing in an editorial in 2014 on what he called the "morally repugnant" nature of the Israeli occupation of the West Bank, contrasted the settlement of Carmel with the Palestinian village of Umm al-Kheir, writing that while the Palestinians are barred from connecting their home to the electric grid and live in tents and huts as the Israeli army demolishes any permanent structure they erect, Carmel is "a lovely green oasis that looks like an American suburb. It has lush gardens, kids riding bikes and air-conditioned homes. It also has a gleaming, electrified poultry barn that it runs as a business." Kristof quotes an Israeli human rights activist remarking on how the chickens in the poultry barn have more access to electricity than the Palestinian residents of Umm al-Kheir.

Haaretz noted about this in 2011: "Right next to the stately country homes - complete with air-conditioning, drip-irrigation gardens and goldfish ponds - a few extended families including old men, old women and infants live in dwellings made of tin, cloth and plastic siding, though there are a few cinder-block structures, too. They tread on broken, barren ground. They have no running water. They are not connected to the power grid that lights up every settlement and outpost in this remote region. They have no access road."

References

Populated places established in 1981
1981 establishments in the Israeli Military Governorate
Israeli settlements in the West Bank